In publishing, a callout or call-out is a short string of text connected by a line, arrow, or similar graphic to a feature of an illustration or technical drawing, and giving information about that feature. The term is also used to describe a short piece of text set in larger type than the rest of the page and intended to attract attention.
In documents that need to be translated often a neutral callout is used. By using numbers or letters as callout in combination with an image caption, translation is more efficient since the same graphic can be used in all languages.

A similar device in word processing is a special text box with or without a small "tail" that can be pointed to different locations on a document.

In the utility industry, a callout is an instruction to report for emergency or special work at an unusual time or place.

Gallery

Arts

In music, call-out hooks are small portions of a song, usually seven to ten seconds of a song's hook used by radio stations "in market research to assist in gauging the popularity of a song by the recognizability of its hook".

See also
 Call-out culture
 Pull-quote
 Speech balloon

References

External links 

Illustration